The Camp Goffs was a sub camp of the US Army Desert Training Center in Riverside County, California. The main headquarters for the Desert Training Center was Camp Young, this is where General Patton's 3rd Armored Division was stationed. Camp Goffs was designated a California Historic Landmark (No.985). The site of the Camp Goffs just north at the former Santa Fe Railroad station at Goffs, California. Currently at the south east end of the Mojave National Preserve. Camp Goffs was 20 miles southeast of Camp Essex and Camp Clipper.

Built in 1942, Camp Goffs was built to prepare troops to do battle during World War II.  When completed the camp had shower buildings, latrines, wooden tent frames, and a water tank. Camp had firing training ranges. Also at the camp was depot: the Goffs Army Ammunition Depot #4. For safety the ammunition storage was keep 3 miles south of the camp, near Goffs Butte. Train at the ranges and camp was the 7th Infantry Division. A total of  15,000 troops were train at the camp. The camp closed in May 1944.

Stationed at Camp Goffs
51st Evacuation Hospital (AGF)
83rd Ordnance Battalion (AGF)
336th Ordnance Motor Transport Supply Company (AGF)
337th Ordnance Motor Transport Company ( (AGF)
530th OrdnanceHeavy Maintenance Company (Tank) (AGF)
3409th Ordnance Automotive Maintenance Company (AGF)
Company C, 207th Quartermaster Gasoline Supply Battalion (AGF)
Company F, 473rd Quartermaster Truck Regiment (AGF)
Company C, 537th Quartermaster Service Battalion (Colored) (AGF)
554th Quartermaster Railhead Company (AGF)
Detachment, 615th Ordnance Ammunition Company (AGF)
2 Platoons, Company A, 694th Quartermaster Laundry Battalion (AGF)

51st Evacuation Hospital
The 51st Evacuation Hospital was started by World War I veteran Dr. Orrin S. Cook. Dr. Orrin Cook worked at Mercy General Hospital, Sacramento, California. He asked the US Army Medical Department to start Army field hospital in Sacramento. With Colonel William E. Shamborra activation start and was headquartered at Fort Ord in Monterey, California.
51st Evacuation Hospital became official in September 1942 stationed now at Fort Lewis in Tacoma, Washington. The 51st Evacuation Hospital operated a 750-bed Evacuation Hospital  Colonel Wendell A. Weller was the first Commanding Officer. In March 1943 the 51st Evacuation Hospital was moved to Fort Lewis and to camp Goffs arriving in April 1943, to support the Desert Training Center. Goffs, California in April 1943. In May 1943 some of the 51st were moved to support the Banning General Hospital. In December 1943 much of the 51st move to Camp San Luis Obispo, California.  The 51st moved to Camp Cooke, Oceano, California for training. In March 1944 the 51st moved to the staging area at Camp Patrick Henry, Oriana, Virginia. From staging area 51st traveled 23 day by a Liberty Ship to Oran, Algeria.  After 2 months the 51st moved to Naples, Italy and ran a hospital at the Naples Fair Grounds till 11 August 1944. Next the 51st moved to Draguignan and set up an Evacuation Hospital. On 29 September 1944 the 51st moved to Vincey, France. In November 1944 they moved to Saint-Dié-des-Vosges. On 14 March 1945 they moved to Sarre-Union, France. On 24 March 1945 they moved to Neustadt, Germany. On 4 April 1945 they  moved to Walldürn, and to  Welzheim on  20 April 1945. On 20 July 1945 they moved to Stuttgart. On 12 October 1945 they ended working Germany and shipped home. On were sent to the 216th General Hospital in Bad Cannstatt in Germany.

Camp Goffs Army Airfield
The abandoned Goffs civil airfield was converted into 'Camp Goffs Army Airfield. The landing strip was two miles to the northeast of the camp. The air strip was used to support training activities and the depot. The runway was used for small planes, like the L-4 Piper Aircraft so the vast training grounds could be watched from the air. At its peak the Camp Goffs Army Airfield was increased so larger military planes could be used. Built were two 4,700 foot runways for the support of Camp Goffs, after the camp closed 1944 the Airfield was abandoned.

Marker
Marker 136 at Camp Goffs in California reads:
The U. S. Army maintained a camp at Goffs 1942–1944. Goffs was an important rail supply point, hospital, and for three months in 1942 Headquarters of the 7th Infantry Division. That unit went on to distinguish itself in combat in the Aleutians and at Kwajalein, Leyte, and Okinawa. This monument is dedicated to all the men and women of the U. S. Army who served here with a special salute to those who laid down their lives for their country.
Erected 2008 by Billy Holcomb Chapter E Clampus Vitus in cooperation with the Mojave Desert Heritage & Cultural Association. (Marker Number 136.)

Goffs, California 

Goffs, California is an unincorporated community in San Bernardino County, California. It was built by the Santa Fe Railroad as Mojave Desert rail station. Santa Fe rail workers lived in the town. Before 1931 Goffs was busy stop on the famous Route 66. when a more direct route between Needles and Amboy was built. Near by town are to the east the town of Homer, to the southwest the town of Fenner and to the north the towns of Blackburn and Purdy. From 1893 to 1902 the town was called 'Blake after Isaac Blake who constructed the Nevada Southern Railway. The Nevada Southern Railway later became part of the California Eastern Railway that operated from 1895 to 1923.  To serve the travels and the Santa Fe rail workers there was a large general store, now abandoned. To teach the children of the rail workers, in 1914 a schoolhouse was built. The schoolhouse is now a mining and military museum called the Mojave Desert Heritage and Cultural Association (MDHCA). There are many abandoned mines around Goffs.

See also
California Historical Landmarks in San Bernardino County, California
California Historical Landmarks in Riverside County, California
Camp Coxcomb 
Camp Granite 
Camp Iron Mountain
Camp Ibis
California during World War II

External links
Training Center Boogie - Sony by John Malcolm Penn, song about : Desert training camps

References

California Historical Landmarks
1942 establishments in California
Military in San Bernardino County, California